Tommy Sandhu (born 24 November 1976) is an English disc jockey remixer, record producer and television presenter.

Career
Sandhu's first presenting job was with Tess Daly on Smash Hits TV for Sky One. He was also the announcer – replacing Graham Skidmore on the final series of the British version of Blind Date, starring Cilla Black.

Sandhu has DJ'd in many London venues, including Chinawhite, Movida, Café de Paris, Paper, Kensington Roof Gardens and the Shadow Lounge. His DJ sets include funky house and rhythm and blues. As a composer, Sandhu has produced the theme music to several TV shows which include Blind Date (ITV), Britain's Next Top Model (LIVING), Celebrity Snappers (Bravo) and I'd Do Anything (BBC One).

Sandhu began his radio career as the London show business reporter for the BBC Asian Network, covering premieres, parties and gossip from the capital, and going on to host the breakfast show on the station. He joined the station's daily schedule in 2010 and left in 2017.

Discography
Cilla Black – Step Inside Love (White Label 12"/Burn 'Em Records) [2003]
Step Inside Love (Original Mix 6:29)
Step Inside Love (Vacation Dub 4:53)
Step Inside Love (All Burnt Out Mix 4:20)
Cilla Black – Beginnings: Greatest Hits & New Songs (EMI Records) [2003]
Step Inside Love (All Burnt Out Mix 4:20) [Hidden Track on CD]
Cilla Black – Beginnings: Revised (EMI Records) [2009]
Step Inside Love (All Burnt Out Mix 4:20)
Cilla Black – Cilla All Mixed Up (EMI Records) [2009]
Faded Images (Tommy Sandhu's Ram Mix 3:55)
Kiss You All Over (Tommy Sandhu's Big Bill Mix 5:00)
Cilla Black – Step Inside Love: Tommy Sandhu Remixes (K-Tel) [2009].
Step Inside Love (2009 The Stunner Mix 3:32)
Step Inside Love (2002 Club Mix 6:37)
Step Inside Love (2002 Vacation Dub 4:59)
Step Inside Love (2002 Club Mix – Radio Edit 3:10)
Step Inside Love (2002 All Burnt Out Mix 4:29)

References

External links

Tommy Sandhu at BBC Online

Game show announcers
Alumni of Bournemouth University
Living people
1976 births
British people of Indian descent